Edward Nelson Parker (26 July 1904 – 15 October 1989) was a United States Navy vice admiral. A graduate of the  United States Naval Academy at Annapolis, Maryland, class of 1925, he was awarded the Navy Cross three times during World War II. He commanded the Armed Forces Special Weapons Project and its successor, the Defense Atomic Support Agency, from 1957 to 1960, and was Deputy Director, Strategic Target Planning, at Offutt Air Force Base in Nebraska from August 1960 to January 1962 in charge of the development of Single Integrated Operational Plan (SIOP), the joint-service plan for the targeting of nuclear weapons in the event of a war with the Soviet Union. He then served as the first Assistant Director of the Weapons Evaluation and Control Bureau in the Arms Control and Disarmament Agency from January 1962 to November 1962, where he was responsible for organizing and initiating Project Cloud Gap, which tested  the feasibility of arms control and disarmament measures.

Early life
Edward Nelson Parker was born in Avalon, Pennsylvania, on 26 July 1904. He was educated at schools in  New Orleans, Louisiana, and Louisville, Kentucky, and entered the United States Naval Academy at Annapolis, Maryland, in 1921. He graduated with the class of 1925, and was commissioned as an ensign. He was nicknamed "Butch".

World War II 
At time of the Japanese bombing of Pearl Harbor that brought the United States into World War II, Parker, was a lieutenant commander, and the skipper of the destroyer , which was part of the Asiatic Fleet. He was awarded the Navy Cross for his part in the Battle of Balikpapan. His citation read:

The following month he earned a second Navy Cross in the Battle of Badung Strait. His citation read:

A week later he earned the Silver Star in the Battle of the Java Sea. His citation read:

In November, Parker earned a third Navy Cross in the Naval Battle of Guadalcanal. His citation read:

This was followed in February 1943 by duty ashore in the Bureau of Ordnance in Washington, D.C., as the head of the Ship Characteristics and Fleet Requirement Section, and then as head of the Planning Engineering Section. He was Assistant Director of the Research and Development Division from February to July 1945, for which he was awarded a Commendation Ribbon.

Post-war 
After the war ended, Parker returned to sea duty in the Pacific in November 1945, leading a destroyer squadron in the Allied occupation of Korea and North China until April 1946. Later that year he participated in the Operation Crossroads nuclear test, for which he received a second Commendation Ribbon. In April 1947, Parker, now a captain, became the logistics officer on the staff of the Commander Marianas in Guam, subsequently becoming the chief of staff there. He returned to the United States in September 1948, where he served in the Office of the Chief of Naval Operations in Washington, D.C., until August 1950, when he assumed command of the cruiser, . On 1 September 1952, he was promoted to rear admiral, and became the deputy chief of Armed Forces Special Weapons Project (AFSWP). He returned to sea duty as commander of Cruiser Division 6 in November 1954. He then became special assistant to the Deputy Chief of Naval Operations for Plans and Policies in May 1956.

In June 1957, Parker became the chief of the chief of the AFSWP. He was the first Naval officer appointed to the position. The AFSWP became the Defense Atomic Support Agency (DASA)  in May 1959, and Parker became its first director. He was promoted to vice admiral in 1960, and served as the  Deputy Director, Strategic Target Planning, at Offutt Air Force Base in Nebraska from August 1960 to January 1962. In this role he was in charge of the development of the Single Integrated Operational Plan (SIOP), the joint-service plan for the targeting of nuclear weapons in the event of a war with the Soviet Union.  He then served as the first Assistant Director of the Weapons Evaluation and Control Bureau in the Arms Control and Disarmament Agency from January 1962 to November 1962. He responsible for organizing and initiating Project Cloud Gap, which tested  the feasibility of arms control and disarmament measures. He was awarded the Legion of Merit and the Navy Distinguished Service Medal for this service. He retired in 1963.

Later life
The day after he retired, Parker set out for Florida with his wife, Elizabeth Denny  Hunter, in their  cabin cruiser. Thereafter, they would spend their winters each year in Pompano, Florida, and return to Annapolis in the spring. In 1969, they decided to stay Florida permanently, moving to Lighthouse Point, Florida. Parker became the commodore of the Lighthouse Point Yacht Club, and the president of the Pompano Beach Gold Coast Council of the Navy League. Elizabeth died in 1981, and he married Louise Wildanger Southworth the following year. He acquired a stepson and two stepdaughters through this marriage.

Parker died at his home in Lighthouse Point on 15 October 1989, and was buried in the United States Naval Academy Cemetery in Annapolis.

Notes

1904 births
1989 deaths
Burials at the United States Naval Academy Cemetery
Military personnel from Pennsylvania
Recipients of the Navy Cross (United States) 
Recipients of the Navy Distinguished Service Medal 
Recipients of the Legion of Merit
United States Navy admirals
United States Naval Academy alumni